Dancing Khilladies  is a 2017-2017 Indian-Tamil-language reality Risky Dance show that aired on Zee Tamil from 18 February 2017 to 3 June 2017 on every Saturday at 8:30PM IST for 16 episodes. The show is hosted by Deepak Dinkar. Actress Sneha, Ambika and accomplished Bharatanatyam dancer and actress Sudha Chandran are the judges of this show.

Host 
 Deepak Dinkar: (Episode 1-16)
 Archana: (Episode 15-16)

Judge
 Sneha
 Sudha Chandran: (Episode 1-10)
 Ambika: (Episode 11-16)

Winners
Guest
 Gayathri Raguram with Zee Tamil Family

Contestants
A total of 8 celebrities, mostly TV actors or Dancers, paired with dancers handpicked through auditions will go head to head in their quest to be best performers.

Episodes

References

External links 
 Dancing Khilladies on ZEE5

Zee Tamil original programming
2017 Tamil-language television series debuts
Tamil-language dance television shows
Tamil-language reality television series
Tamil-language television shows
2017 Tamil-language television series endings
Television shows set in Tamil Nadu